DJ-Kicks: Terranova is a DJ mix album, mixed by Terranova. It was released on 19 January 1998 on the Studio !K7 independent record label as part of the DJ-Kicks series.

Track listing
 "Intro" - Terranova – 0:40
 "Five Days" - Howie B (B., Bernstein) – 1:43
 "Disorientation" - Priest (Blaize, Priest) – 3:53
 "Sex Sluts And Heaven" - Depth Charge (Kane) – 3:26
 "Galactic Funk" - DJ Spooky (Paul D. Miller) – 4:20
 "Tried By 12" - East Flatbush Project (Spencer Bellamy, Smith) – 2:41
 "Run The Line" - Peanut Butter Wolf (Chris Manak) – 3:15
 "Devil's Claw" - Ultimatum (Birch, Hallam) – 0:43
 "Please Stand By" - BFC (Carl Craig) – 4:49
 "City Lights (City Of Starsigns)" - Patrick Pulsinger (Richard Dorfmeister, Patrick Pulsinger) – 2:54
 "Ladies And Gentlemen" - 69 Jazzfunkclassics (Six Nine ) – 10:42
 "Definition Of A Track" - Backroom (Jenkins, Richardson) – 5:36
 "Who Needs To Sleep Tonight" - Silicon Soul (Olgalyn Jolly, K. L. Schafer) – 0:05
 "Modern Funk Beats" - The Octagon Man (Kane) – 1:16
 "Tokyo Tower" - Terranova (Göttsching, Terranova) – 5:09
 "I Love You" - DSL (DJ DSL) – 2:43
 "Stop It Stop It Stop It" - Ultimatum (Birch, Hallam) – 1:04
 "Jungle Brother" - Jungle Brothers (DJ Sammy B, Mike Gee, Hall, Jungle Brothers) – 4:56
 "The Word" - Junkyard Band (Baker, Fergenbaum, Steve Harrison, Powell, Smith, Strong, Watkins) – 3:28
 "Spoonie Rap" - Spoonie Gee (Adams, Brown, Jackson) – 4:27
 "Contact/DJ Kicks" - Terranova (Fetisch, Kaos, Meister) – 4:47

Personnel 

Howie B – Performer
BFC – Performer
Depth Charge – Performer
DJ Spooky – Performer
East Flatbush Project – Performer
Jungle Brothers – Performer
Junkyard Band – Performer
Ali Kepenek – Photography
Octagon Man – Performer
Patrick Pulsinger – Performer
Marc Schilkowski – Design
Silicon Soul – Performer
Spoonie Gee – Performer
Stereo MC's – Performer

References

External links 
DJ-Kicks website

Terranova
1998 compilation albums